Gordon Gekko is a composite character in the 1987 film Wall Street and its 2010 sequel Wall Street: Money Never Sleeps, both directed by Oliver Stone. Gekko was portrayed by actor Michael Douglas, whose performance in the first film won him an Oscar for Best Actor.

Co-written by Stone and screenwriter Stanley Weiser, Gekko is said to be based loosely on several actual financiers, including Stone's own father Louis Stone and corporate raider Asher Edelman. According to Edward R. Pressman, producer of the film, "Originally, there was no one individual who Gekko was modeled on", but added that "Gekko was partly Milken", who was the "Junk Bond King" of the 1980s. Gekko's "Greed is good" speech was influenced by a commencement address given by Ivan Boesky for the University of California, Berkeley School of Business, May 1986, where he commented on the beneficial side of greed.

In 2003, the American Film Institute named Gordon Gekko No. 24 on its Top 50 movie villains of all time.

Cultural impact
Gekko has become a symbol in popular culture for unrestrained greed (with the signature line, "Greed, for lack of a better word, is good"), often in fields outside corporate finance.

In the movie Boiler Room, a group of stock brokers (played by Vin Diesel, Nicky Katt, and Ben Affleck) gather at a friends house and watch Wall Street. The characters begin to perfectly quote Gekko's phone conversation when he first is introduced to Bud.

In 2003, the American Film Institute named Gordon Gekko No. 24 on its Top 50 movie villains of all time.

On September 25, 2008, Michael Douglas, acting as a UN ambassador for peace, was at the 2008 session of the United Nations General Assembly. Reporters sought to ask him off-topic questions about Gekko. He was asked whether he "bore some responsibility for the behavior of the greed merchants who had brought the world to its knees". Trying to return to topic, Douglas suggested that "the same level of passion Wall Street investors showed should also apply to getting rid of nuclear weapons." Douglas was also asked to compare nuclear Armageddon with the "financial Armageddon on Wall Street". After one reporter inquired, "Are you saying, Gordon, that greed is not good?" Douglas stated, "I'm not saying that. And my name is not Gordon. It's a character I played 20 years ago."

On October 8, 2008, the character was referenced by Australian Prime Minister Kevin Rudd in his speech, "The Children of Gordon Gekko" concerning the financial crisis of 2007–2010. Rudd stated "It is perhaps time now to admit that we did not learn the full lessons of the greed-is-good ideology. And today we are still cleaning up the mess of the 21st-century children of Gordon Gekko."

In the October 30, 2008, episode of American comedy series The Office, Ryan Howard's Halloween costume is Gordon Gekko.

On July 28, 2009, Cardinal Tarcisio Bertone cited Gekko's "Greed is good" slogan in a speech to the Italian Senate, saying that the free market had been replaced by a greed market, and also blamed such a mentality for the 2007–2008 financial crisis.

The FBI has used Michael Douglas' Gekko for an anti-insider trading campaign.

In 2013, psychiatrists Samuel Leistedt and Paul Linkowski published a study of the portrayal of psychopaths in film, and cited the Gekko character as a realistic portrayal of the successful, "corporate psychopath": "In terms of a 'successful psychopath, they write, "Gordon Gekko from Wall Street (1987) is probably one of the most interesting, manipulative, psychopathic fictional characters to date."

The character Gordon Gekko is commemorated in the scientific name of a species of gecko, Cyrtodactylus gordongekkoi.

See also
 Margin Call
 Swimming with Sharks
 The Wolf of Wall Street

Notes

External links

Speech before stockholders
Forbes profile
Analysis of Gekko's character and legal status

Drama film characters
Fictional American Jews
Fictional business executives
Fictional characters from New York City
Film characters introduced in 1987
Fictional white-collar criminals
Male characters in film
Male film villains
Fictional socialites
Fictional bankers
Fictional philanthropists